The 1952 Montana Grizzlies football team represented the University of Montana in the 1952 college football season as a member of the Skyline Conference. The Grizzlies were led by first-year head coach Ed Chinske, played their home games at Dornblaser Field and finished the season with a record of two wins, seven losses and one tie (2–7–1, 1–5 Skyline).

Schedule

References

Montana
Montana Grizzlies football seasons
Montana Grizzlies football